Bessie Head Short Story Awards (Bessie Head Literature Awards from 2007 to 2013) is a Botswana literary award founded in 2007. It is administered by the Bessie Head Heritage Trust. The Trust was established in June 2007 to promote the life and work of Bessie Head. The goal of the award is to help preserve Bessie Head's legacy in Botswana, and to encourage the development of Botswana literature in various genres in English. 

From 2007 to 2013 the awards were given for best novel, short story, poetry and children's story. The poetry and children's story awards were bi-annual, the novel and short story awards are annual.  

Beginning in 2015, the award focused changed to a short-story award.

History
In 2012, it was announced there would be no awards for the year. Reasons given include the withdraw of the financial sponsor Pentagon Publishers; and a lack of organization to handle the large number of submissions. They announced "We intend to resume the Literature Awards as soon as this is possible, hopefully in 2013."

Winners
2007
Novel: Khonani Ontebetse for Born with a Husband
Short Story: Bontekanye Botumile for “Which Doctor”
Poetry: Monty Fanikiso Moswela for “Meeting in Francistown”

2008
Novel: Phidson Mojokeri for Curse of a Dream
Short Story: Lauri Kubuitsile for "Solar Heater"
Poetry: Ita Mannathoko for "Kgalagadi, the Great Thirst"

2009
Novel: Cheryl Selase Ntumy for Crossing 
Short Story: Gothataone Moeng for "Putting On Faces" 
Poetry: Luda Sekga for "He Was My Oppressor"

2010
Novel: Tshetsana Senau for Travelling To The Sun: The Diary Of Ruth 
Short Story: Legodile Seganabeng for "The Moon Has Eyes" 
Children's Story: Jenny Robson for "The Right Time"

2011
Novel: Tlotlo Pearl Tsamaase for Unlettered Skies of the Sublime
Short Story: Boikhutso Robert for “The Zambezi Crocodiles”
Poetry: John Hutcheson for “The Massacre of Innocents”, “The Man”, “Curse”

2012
No awards

2013
Novel: Veronica Jane McLean for The Hot Chain
Short Story: Moreetsi Pius Gabang for “Lesilo mo Maun”
Children's Story: Margaret Baffour-Awuah for “Two Frogs Go A'Wandering”

2014
 No award

2015
 First: Donald Molosi for the story "The Biggest Continent"
 Second: Siyanda Mohutsiwa, for "And Then We Disappeared into Some Guy's Car"
 Third: Vamika Sinha, for "Love and Other Almosts"

2016
 Caiphus Mmino Mangenela for the story "A Mother Amongst the Stars"

References

External links
Bessie Head Literature Awards, official page.
Previous winners

Botswana literary awards
Awards established in 2007